Marcgravia caudata is a species of Marcgravia native to Bolivia. It belongs to Marcgraviaceae family.

References 

caudata
Plants described in 1862